Leigh Creek Energy is an Australian company which is developing an in-situ coal gasification (ISG) project at Leigh Creek, South Australia. It was renamed from Marathon Resources in September 2015.

Leigh Creek Energy Project
Leigh Creek Energy holds petroleum licences over the Leigh Creek Coalfield, a large coal deposit which spans approximately seven kilometres at Leigh Creek. The company's flagship Leigh Creek Energy Project intends to produce gas at the site of the former Leigh Creek coal mine and develop a fertiliser production facility using waste gas streams and produce ammonium nitrate fertiliser for use by Australia's farming sector and for export. The LCEP will also generate electricity via gas turbines to supply power to the project and Leigh Creek township.

History
Project planning commenced in 2011, and an exploration license was obtained by the company in November 2014. 

On 12 April 2018, Leigh Creek Energy received approval for its Statement of Environmental Objectives to run a in-situ coal gasification trial at Leigh Creek. The company successfully ran the pilot project and produced syngas for a period of 4 months and analyzed the sample gas quality.

The in-situ coal gasification trail was completed during April 2019 and the site will be monitored for the next 3 years to prove that there are no environmental concerns with the process.

References

External links
Company website

Companies based in Adelaide
Companies listed on the Australian Securities Exchange
Synthetic fuel companies